= Results of the 1974 Canadian federal election =

1974 Canadian federal election

== Results by Province and Territory ==
=== Alberta ===
Results in Alberta
Party	Seats	Second	Third	Fourth	Fifth	Sixth	Seventh	Eighth	Votes	%	+/-
Progressive Conservative	19								417,422	61.15	
Liberals		19							168,973	24.76	
NDP			17	2					63,310	9.28	
Social Credit			1	15	1				22,909	3.36	
No affiliation to a recognised party			1				1		7,148	1.05	
Independent				1	4	1			1,524	0.22	
Communist					2	3			745	0.11	
Marxist–Leninist						2	3	1	538	0.08	
Total	19								682,569	100.0	

=== British Columbia ===
Results in British Columbia
Party	Seats	Second	Third	Fourth	Fifth	Sixth	Seventh	Votes	%	+/-
Progressive Conservative	13	7	3					423,954	41.94	
Liberals	8	11	4					336,436	33.28	
NDP	2	5	16					232,547	23	
Social Credit				10				12,433	1.23	
Communist				7	5			3,051	0.3	
Marxist–Leninist				1	7	1	2	1,205	0.12	
Independent				2	1	3		1,134	0.11	
No affiliation to a recognised party						2		122	0.01	
Total	23							1,010,882	100.0	

=== Manitoba ===
Results in Manitoba
Party	Seats	Second	Third	Fourth	Fifth	Sixth	Seventh	Votes	%	+/-
Progressive Conservative	9	4						212,990	47.67	
Liberals	2	6	5					122,546	27.43	
NDP	2	3	8					104,829	23.46	
Social Credit				10				4,750	1.06	
Communist					2		1	667	0.15	
Marxist–Leninist				1	1	2	1	477	0.11	
Independent				1				286	0.06	
No affiliation to a recognised party					2	1		262	0.06	
Total	13							446,807	100.0	

=== New Brunswick ===
Results in New Brunswick
Party	Seats	Second	Third	Fourth	Fifth	Votes	%	+/-
Liberals	6	4				135,723	47.23	
Progressive Conservative	3	6	1			94,934	33.04	
NDP			7	3		24,869	8.65	
Independent	1			1		23,299	8.11	
Social Credit			2	2	1	8,407	2.93	
Marxist–Leninist				1		118	0.04	
Total	10					287,350	100.0	

=== Newfoundland and Labrador ===
Results in Newfoundland and Labrador
Party	Seats	Second	Third	Fourth	Votes	%	+/-
Liberals	4	3			81,299	46.74	
Progressive Conservative	3	4			75,816	43.59	
NDP			7		16,445	9.45	
Independent				1	242	0.14	
Social Credit				1	143	0.08	
Total	7				173,945	100.0	

=== Northwest Territories ===
Results in Northwest Territories
Party	Seats	Second	Third	Votes	%	+/-
NDP	1			5,410	42.09	
Progressive Conservative		1		4,271	33.23	
Liberals			1	3,173	24.68	
Total	1			12,854	100.0	

=== Nova Scotia ===
Results in Nova Scotia
Party	Seats	Second	Third	Fourth	Fifth	Votes	%	+/-
Progressive Conservative	8	2	1			183,897	47.54	
Liberals	2	9				157,582	40.73	
NDP	1		10			43,470	11.24	
Social Credit				7	1	1,457	0.38	
Marxist–Leninist				1	3	458	0.12	
Total	11					386,864	100.0	

=== Ontario ===
Results in Ontario
Party	Seats	Second	Third	Fourth	Fifth	Sixth	Seventh	Votes	%	+/-
Liberals	55	33						1,609,786	45.13	
Progressive Conservative	25	41	22					1,253,656	35.15	
NDP	8	14	66					680,113	19.07	
Social Credit				14	6			6,575	0.18	
Independent				15	8	7		5,232	0.15	
Communist				20	10	2	1	4,706	0.13	
No affiliation to a recognised party				6	1	1	2	3,652	0.1	
Marxist–Leninist				3	14	16	4	3,354	0.09	
Total	88							3,567,074	100.0	

=== Prince Edward Island ===
Results in Prince Edward Island
Party	Seats	Second	Third	Fourth	Votes	%	+/-
Progressive Conservative	3	1			28,578	49.06	
Liberals	1	3			26,932	46.23	
NDP			4		2,666	4.58	
No affiliation to a recognised party				1	77	0.13	
Total	4				58,253	100.0	

=== Quebec ===
Results in Quebec
Party	Seats	Second	Third	Fourth	Fifth	Sixth	Seventh	Eighth	Votes	%	+/-
Liberals	60	14							1,330,337	54.1	
Progressive Conservative	3	45	25	1					520,992	21.19	
Social Credit	11	13	27	18					420,018	17.08	
NDP		2	21	45	4				162,080	6.59	
Marxist–Leninist				4	17	14	3		9,885	0.4	
Independent				2	10	1	2	1	6,712	0.27	
No affiliation to a recognised party				1	10	1	1		6,414	0.26	
Communist					4	8	2		2,597	0.11	
Total	74								2,459,035	100.0	

=== Saskatchewan ===
Results in Saskatchewan
Party	Seats	Second	Third	Fourth	Fifth	Sixth	Votes	%	+/-
Progressive Conservative	8	2	3				150,896	36.45	
NDP	2	8	3				130,391	31.5	
Liberals	3	3	7				127,282	30.75	
Social Credit				12			4,539	1.1	
Communist					2		334	0.08	
Independent					1		316	0.08	
Marxist–Leninist					1	1	226	0.05	
Total	13						413,984	100.0	

=== Yukon ===
Results in Yukon
Party	Seats	Second	Third	Votes	%	+/-
Progressive Conservative	1			3,913	47.06	
Liberals		1		2,784	33.48	
NDP			1	1,618	19.46	
Total	1			8,315	100.0	
